Holly Branigan FRSE is a Professor of Psychology of Language and Cognition and Head of the School of Philosophy, Psychology and Language Sciences at the University of Edinburgh, Scotland.

Education 
Branigan has attended the University of York, the Université de Lille III and the University of Edinburgh. She completed her PhD in Cognitive Science at the University of Edinburgh in 1995.

Career 
Branigan's research interests include language production, communication, language learning/development and language processing. Her research covers typically and atypically developing children, mono and bilingual adults and a wide range of languages.

Branigan became the Head of the School of Philosophy, Psychology and Language Studies at the University of Edinburgh in 2018; having been Deputy Head since 2016.

Awards 
In March 2021, Branigan was selected as a Fellow by the Royal Society of Edinburgh.

References 

Fellows of the Royal Society of Edinburgh
Living people
Women in Scotland
Alumni of the University of York
Academics of the University of Edinburgh
Year of birth missing (living people)